Amblyseius aricae is a species of mite in the Phytoseiidae family. It was described by Karg in 1976.

References

aricae
Animals described in 1976